Neal William Schmitt (born 1944) is an American psychologist specializing in personnel psychology and industrial and organizational psychology. He is a University Distinguished Professor in the Department of Psychology at Michigan State University, where he previously served as interim dean of the College of Social Science. He is a former editor-in-chief of the Journal of Applied Psychology.

In 2014, Schmitt received the James McKeen Cattell Fellow Award from the Association for Psychological Science. In 2015, he and Robert Sellers jointly received the Award for Distinguished Service to Psychological Science from the American Psychological Association.

References

External links
Faculty page

Living people
1944 births
21st-century American psychologists
Loras College alumni
Purdue University alumni
Michigan State University faculty
Academic journal editors
20th-century American psychologists